Eska Mtungwazi (born 1971), known professionally as Eska, is a London-born British singer-songwriter and multi-instrumentalist. Following her inaugural release as a solo artist with her 2013 Gatekeeper EP, her eponymous debut album, ESKA, was released on 27 April 2015.

Early and personal life
Mtungwazi grew up in South-East London of Zimbabwean parents who moved to the city with her and her siblings when she was two. She describes her early musical exposure as "anything and everything. It was a really crazy mixture", but cites Quincy Jones as being particularly influential at her young age. With the assistance of her teachers, she began learning the violin, earning herself a scholarship at The Conservatoire in Blackheath, while also exploring her other musical interests such as Bob Marley.

Life and career
After gaining a BSc in Mathematics from the London School of Economics, Mtungwazi became a teacher of Maths and Music During this time she spent many years as a backing singer on other musicians' projects, and steadily built a reputation in the UK for her featured work with an eclectic range of established British artists and bands, including Grace Jones and Bobby McFerrin.

Following vocal credits on many independent releases throughout the 2000s, in 2013 she released her debut solo project titled Gatekeeper EP on her own Earthling Recordings label, which featured five original tracks and was co-produced by producers Matthew Herbert and David Okumu. The EP attracted worldwide critical acclaim, including BBC Radio 6 tastemaker Gilles Peterson, who called her "one of the most important singers in the UK right now", and Jamie Cullum, who declared the EP's title song to be "an unbelievable track that will be hard to beat in 2013". The title track from the EP was also selected by Peterson for his Brownswood Bubblers 10 compilation, which was released on Brownswood Recordings.

In June 2022 Eska provided the support act for Grace Jones who programmed this year's Meltdown festival at London's Southbank Centre.

ESKA
Mtungwazi released her eponymous debut album ESKA on 26 April 2015. ESKA was well received by critics, and was nominated for the 2015 Mercury Music Prize.

Second album
On 18 August 2016, it was announced via Billboard that Eska would be one of 18 emerging artists to receive #Momentum funding from the PRS Foundation Speaking on her selection, PRSF said "Eska’s restless inventiveness will continue to be explored further on her sophomore album and in her live performances which have become legendary showcases for this inimitable artist.

Vocalist for Zero 7
In 2007, when Sia left Zero 7, Eska joined as vocalist. Her influence resulted in a new emphasis on pop music for the group.

Discography

Albums
ESKA (2015)

EPs
Gatekeeper EP (2013)

Singles
As main artist
"Rock of Ages" (2015), Earthling Recordings
"Shades of Blue" (2015), Earthling Recordings
"Many People of the Songbird" (with Jesse Hackett and Louis Hackett) (2016), Gearbox

As featured artist
"What U Do" (with Colours / Stephen Emmanuel) (1998), Inferno – UK No. 51
"Coochy Coo" (as En-Core with Stephen Emmanuel) (2000), Ice Cream Records – UK No. 32
"Home" (with Uschi Classen) (2000), Earth Project
"Sunset" (with Nitin Sawhney) (2001), V2 Records – UK No. 65
"Rocc It 2nite" (with Quango) (2004), People
"The Way We Like It" (with Natalie Williams & Ty) (2006), East Side Records
"Dirty Basement" (with Elektrons) (2007), Genuine/PIAS Recordings/Wall of Sound
"Monosabio Blues" (with Gecko Turner) (2007), LoveMonk

References

External links
 – official site

1971 births
Living people
English women singer-songwriters
English women guitarists
English guitarists
English record producers
English people of Zimbabwean descent
21st-century Black British women singers
People from Lewisham
Singers from London
British women record producers
21st-century British guitarists
UK garage singers
21st-century women guitarists